Vonk may refer to:
Vonk (surname) 
Vonk (Belgium), Belgian trotskyist group
Vonk (Netherlands), Dutch trotskyist group

See also
Vonck (surname)
Vonka